Apewosika is a suburb of Cape Coast and a community in the Cape Coast Municipality in the Central Region of Ghana.

History 
Apewosika is said to be about 200 years old. In 1970, the community had a population of about 673 people.

Facilities 

 Apewosika University Hospital
 Apewosika Municipal Assembly JHS

Notable native 

 Kwamena Minta Nyarku

References 

Central Region (Ghana)
Communities in Ghana